Anwar Sajjad, more commonly known as Enver Sajjad (27 May 1935 – 6 June 2019) was a Pakistani playwright and fiction writer. Because he was a novelist, playwright, actor, director, producer, voice-over artist, columnist, painter, dancer and physician, he has been described as a polymath.

Early life and career
He was born in 1935 in Lahore. Sajjad completed his higher studies in medicine from King Edward Medical College before heading out to the University of Liverpool for a Diploma in Tropical Medicine and Hygiene. He was a medical doctor by profession.

He began to write in the 1950s, when he was still a teenager.

Anwar Sajjad was also a television actor who starred in a number of PTV productions and was also nominated for a PTV award for his performance in drama serial Saba aur Samandar. He was also an active member of the Lahore circle of literary figures and artists and had also chaired the Pakistan Arts Council, Lahore in the past.

Anwar Sajjad had also worked for, before his death, the National Academy of Performing Arts. He quit this job due to his illness and other personal reasons.

In the early days of television, after its introduction in Pakistan in 1964, it was the Pakistani television pioneer Aslam Azhar who persuaded writers like Ashfaq Ahmed, Bano Qudsia and Anwar Sajjad to write for television.

Work
His notable works of published fiction include:
 Chauraha
 Janam Roop
 Khushiyon Ka Baagh
 Neeli Notebook 
He wrote a number of plays for Pakistani television including:
 Picnic
 Raat ka Pichla Pehar
 Koyal 
 Yeh Zameen Meri Hai
He also wrote and directed Theatre Plays
 Aik Thi Malika
 Khatra e Jan
 Meri Jan
 Faslay

Awards and recognition
Pride of Performance Award in 1989 by the President of Pakistan.

Death
Anwar Sajjad died on 6 June 2019 at Lahore, Pakistan at age 84. Among the survivors are his wife and a daughter.

References

External links 

 

1935 births
2019 deaths
Pakistani dramatists and playwrights
Pakistani television writers
Pakistani  tropical physicians
Punjabi people
Recipients of the Pride of Performance
King Edward Medical University alumni
Alumni of the University of Liverpool